Wayne Carini (born October 13, 1951) is an American car restorer and TV personality. Carini stars in the Chasing Classic Cars TV series.

Personal life 
Wayne Carini was born in Portland, Connecticut, on October 13th, 1951. He is the son of Robert (Bob) Carini who owned a collision repair and auto restoration business in Glastonbury, Connecticut. He eventually inherited half of the family business as a gift.

Professional career 
Carini started his career in his father's shop while still in grade school, working together on classics including Duesenbergs, Lincolns, Packards, Ford Model As and Garth Crooks Specials.

Carini has served as a grand marshal at the Klingberg Vintage Motorcar Festival, conducted in New Britain, Connecticut.

He was involved in the TV show My Classic Car as himself and he appeared in Overhaulin', a reality TV series.

Chasing Classic Cars 

Carini's lifelong chasing of vintage cars was noticed by Jim Astrausky, the chief of Essex Television Group Inc. Astrausky approached Carini for a television show. The show airs on the Motor Trend channel.

References

External links 
 
 F40 Motorsports

Living people
1951 births
Car restorers
People from Connecticut
Conservation and restoration of vehicles
American television personalities